The following is a list of episodes of ABS-CBN's Muling Buksan ang Puso, which stars Julia Montes, Enrique Gil, and Enchong Dee. The soap opera premiered on July 8, 2013, and centers on three generations of love and betrayal, and how the sins of the past continue to haunt two families whose lives are destined to be intertwined. The show replaced Apoy Sa Dagat, which ended on July 5, 2013, and took over the time slot previously occupied by Huwag Ka Lang Mawawala. Muling Buksan ang Puso aired at 8:30pm (PST), Mondays to Fridays during Primetime Bida. The pilot episode ranked #2 on the night of July 8, 2013 with a rating of 28.4%. On August 26, 2013, Muling Buksan ang Puso moved to a later timeslot at 9:30-10:15pm.

Series overview

Episodes summary

Season 1

Season 2

References

Lists of soap opera episodes
Lists of Philippine drama television series episodes